is a Japanese politician who has served as the Minister of Economy, Trade and Industry since August 2022. Nishimura previously served as Minister of State for Economic and Fiscal Policy from 2019 to 2021. A member of the Liberal Democratic Party, he has been a member of the House of Representatives since 2003, representing Hyogo’s 9th district.

In the second Kishida cabinet, Nishimura is serving as minister of Economy, Trade and Industry; minister in charge of the Response to the Economic Impact Caused by the Nuclear Accident; Green Transformation; Industrial Competitiveness; Economic Cooperation with Russia; and the Nuclear Damage Compensation and Decommissioning Facilitation Corporation.

Early life and career 

A native of Akashi, Hyōgo and a relative of Akira Fukida, a former Minister of Home Affairs, Nishimura graduated the University of Tokyo, Faculty of Law in 1985.

Nishimura joined the Ministry of International Trade and Industry in 1985 and graduated from Graduate School of Public Affairs, University of Maryland in 1992 while in the ministry. In 2003 he was elected for the first time as an independent after running unsuccessfully in 2000. He later joined the LDP.

Nishimura was running for the LDP presidential elections which was held September 28, 2009, and came in third after Sadakazu Tanigaki who was elected, and Kōno Tarō. In the 2021 presidential election, Nishimura was the lead sponsor for Sanae Takaishi.

Nishimura also served as acting director, Land, Infrastructure and Transport Division of LDP, Parliamentary Secretary for Foreign Affairs (Fukuda Cabinet), Deputy Chairman, Policy Research Council of LDP, Minister of Economy, Trade and Industry of LDP's Shadow Cabinet, Senior Vice Minister of Cabinet Office.

Since September 2019, Nishimura is serving as minister for economic and fiscal policy; economic revitalization; social security reform; the Trans-Pacific Partnership; and as minister for COVID-19 pandemic response from March 2020 until October 2021.

On 8 July 2021, Nishimura announced the government would seek financial institutions "to lobby [their] customers that operate bars and restaurants to comply with government requests to temporarily close" and possibly to withhold loans to holdouts, as well as to request beverage wholesale companies to stop trading with such businesses. The government retracted the policy a day later, however, with the chief cabinet secretary Katsunobu Kato stating "he had instructed Nishimura to be more careful about what he says during news conferences".

In 2013, Nishimura has denied the accusation that he used a prostitute during his 2012 visit to Vietnam.

In August 2021, Nishimura became the first Suga cabinet minister to visit the controversial Yasukuni Shrine that enshrine the WWII war criminals. The visit was made the day after his remarks urging people to stay-at-home orders during the Obon season  amid COVID-19 Delta surge across Japan. On 1 October 2021, Nishimura announced that Japan will likely becoming a living with COVID-19 endemic phase.

Prior to the Fukushima nuclear accident in 2011, Nishimura has stated to push for restarts of more than 10 nuclear reactors. Nishimura said the government will keep its stakes in Sakhalin-II, one of the world’s largest integrated and export-oriented oil and gas projects, owned by Gazprom, Shell, Mitsui and Mitsubishi.

In June 2022, Nishimura was criticized for hosting on his official website for 10 years a gallery of street photography of women, apparently without their consent, titled "Picture book of beauties from around the world." Nishimura's August 2022 visit to Yasukuni became the first from the Kishida cabinet.

Ideology 
Nishimura is affiliated to the openly revisionist lobby Nippon Kaigi, He advocates its main causes, which are: the revision of the constitution, the right for collective self-defense (revision of Article 9), visits to the controversial Yasukuni Shrine.

Nishimura is also a member of several right-wing Diet groups, including:

 - NB: SAS a.k.a. Sinseiren, Shinto Political League
(as the chairman)

References

External links
 Official website in Japanese

Members of the House of Representatives (Japan)
Living people
Members of Nippon Kaigi
1962 births
Liberal Democratic Party (Japan) politicians
21st-century Japanese politicians
Politicians from Hyōgo Prefecture
People from Akashi, Hyōgo
University of Tokyo alumni